Hamptophryne (common name: bleating frogs) is a small genus of microhylid frogs from South America. The genus was previously monotypic, but because of the close phylogenetic relationship between Hamptophryne and Altigius, another monotypic genus, the latter was placed in synonymy with Hamptophryne in 2012.

Species
There are two species in the genus:
 Hamptophryne alios (Wild, 1995)
 Hamptophryne boliviana (Parker, 1927)

References

 
Microhylidae
Amphibians of South America
Amphibian genera
Taxa named by Antenor Leitão de Carvalho
Taxonomy articles created by Polbot